Parcani is a village in Sopot municipality that belongs to the City of Belgrade. According to last census in 2002 there are 657 inhabitants.

Suburbs of Belgrade
Sopot, Belgrade
Šumadija